The Kedah-class offshore patrol vessels of the Royal Malaysian Navy (RMN) are six ships based on the MEKO 100 design by Blohm + Voss. Originally, a total of 27 ships were planned, but due to programme delays and overruns, only six were eventually ordered. Their construction began in the early 2000s, and by 2009, all six were in active service. The six vessels are named after Malaysian states.

Classification
While their size and tonnage implies the Kedah-class ships to be corvettes, they are classified as offshore patrol vessels (OPVs) by the Royal Malaysian Navy, a category more common with law enforcement or coast guard vessels, not naval warships. This is rooted in the fact that the Kedah class was delivered in a condition named for but not with, meaning that certain weapon systems were not included in the original purchase, but all provisions to install and use them, including sensors and electronics, are already present in the ships. The weapons themselves can be easily "plugged in" with little delay as soon as the Royal Malaysian Navy has purchased them. These purchases however have not yet been made. Currently, the Kedah-class vessels are armed with guns only (76 mm gun on the bow, 30 mm gun on the aft), making them quite lightly armed and fairly vulnerable for naval ships of their size, thus justifying their listing as OPVs rather than proper corvettes.

Development
In the 1990s, the Royal Malaysian Navy identified the need to replace their ageing patrol boats. These 31 m long vessels built by Vosper Ltd with a displacement of 96 tons had been in service since the 1960s. After receiving government approval, the Royal Malaysian Navy ran a competition for the design in 1996, planning to purchase 27 vessels over 15 years. The specifications aimed for a design with a displacement of 1,300 tons and an overall length of 80 m. It was already noted at that time that this resembled full-fledged corvettes rather than patrol vessels, but the eventual winning bid would turn out to be even larger. The Australian bid proposed a Joint Patrol Vessel, to be designed by Australian Transfield Shipbuilding and subsequently purchased by the Royal Malaysian Navy as well as the Royal Australian Navy. Other contenders were the German Naval Group consortium as well as British shipyards Vosper Thornycroft and Yarrow Shipbuilders.

In October 1997, the German Naval Group consortium, headed by Blohm + Voss, was declared the winner with their design based on the modular MEKO family of warships, and a contract for six vessels was signed by the Royal Malaysian Navy and PSC-Naval Dockyard on 5 September 1998, with a unit cost of 270 million dollar per vessel.

Progress delay

The shipbuilding has been plagued by financial and technical problems and delays. The first setback occurred when the first hull completed by PSC-Naval Dockyard failed to pass pre-delivery sea trials due to technical problems and quality issues. The crisis continued until the Malaysian government replaced the management team. The programme resumed, but the scandal discouraged the Malaysian Government from further investments.

In June 2006, after a total of 18 months of delays, the Royal Malaysian Navy commissioned KD Kedah, followed by a second hull, KD Pahang in August of the same year, and a third hull, KD Perak on 12 November 2007. By July 2009, six vessels had been launched.

Characteristics
The Kedah class is based on the MEKO 100 corvette. It is designed to have low radar detectability, low noise, low heat dissipation, and have an economical cruising speed. The main radar, TRS-3D/16-ES is a fully coherent multi-mode phased array C-band radar capable of fully automatic detection, track initiation, and classification of various types of targets. It is capable to track 400 air and surface targets with the detection range up to 200 km and the corresponding update times between 1 and 6 seconds. An advanced control system known as Integrated Platform Management System (IPMS) is used to monitor and control the platform machinery of the ships, including propulsion, electrical, damage control, and auxiliary machinery and systems.

Due to the small ship complement, the design relies on a high degree of automation for improved operational effectiveness and survivability of the ships. The design uses intelligent electronics and sensors interconnected by data buses. This enables monitoring and control of machinery from several shipboard locations. The ship has redundant systems to improve survivability.

All Kedah-class vessels are fitted for but not with the RIM-116 Rolling Airframe Missile (RAM) surface-to-air missile and the Exocet MM40 Block 2 anti-ship missile. It also can fitted with BrahMos cruise missile if it was purchased. Once the weapons themselves were purchased, it would reportedly take only one day for them to be installed, after which they could be immediately used with full functionality.

Improved design and next order
In Defence Services Asia 2018 (DSA 2018) BHIC unveiled the new improved design of the Kedah-class to fulfill the Royal Malaysian Navy modernization program, 15 to 5 program. Under this program 12 more Kedah-class will be order to complement the six existing Kedah-class makes the total of 18 Kedah-class will be in service with Royal Malaysian Navy. The design incorporated improvement in stealth design where the ships will have low radar cross section then before. This new design also modular where the end user can choose whether to armed this ships with guns only or to fitted for but not with missiles and torpedo.

Major operation

KD Pahang involved in Anti-piracy measures in Somalia in 2008.

KD Perak involved in naval blockade in 2013 Lahad Datu standoff.

Ships of the class

All ships of the class were named after states in Peninsular Malaysia.

Gallery

References

Patrol ship classes